Conjurer may refer to:

 A performer of evocation, the act of summoning a spirit or other supernatural agent
 A performer of stage magic
 Conjurer (composition), a 2007 composition by John Corigliano
 Conjurer (film), a 2008 American supernatural horror film
 The Conjurer (painting), a 1502 painting by Hieronymus Bosch

See also
 Conjure (disambiguation)
 Conjuration (disambiguation)